Joachim Wendt (born 18 December 1962) is an Austrian fencer. He competed at five consecutive Summer Olympics between 1984 and 2000.

See also
 List of athletes with the most appearances at Olympic Games

References

External links
 

1962 births
Living people
People from Spittal an der Drau
Austrian male foil fencers
Olympic fencers of Austria
Fencers at the 1984 Summer Olympics
Fencers at the 1988 Summer Olympics
Fencers at the 1992 Summer Olympics
Fencers at the 1996 Summer Olympics
Fencers at the 2000 Summer Olympics
Sportspeople from Carinthia (state)